Maehwa-cha or plum blossom tea is a traditional Korean tea made by infusing dried flowers of Korean plum in hot water. During the early spring, half-open buds of plum blossoms are picked, dried, and preserved in honey. It is served, with ten flowers in a teapot and by pouring  of hot water. The tea can be enjoyed after one to two minutes of steeping.

Gallery

See also 
 Maesil-cha, Korean plum tea
 Suānméitāng, Chinese sour plum drink

References 

Korean tea
Flower tea